Oliver Mazurtšak (born 26 August 1993), known professionally as Ollie (stylised in all caps), is an Estonian singer, songwriter, guitarist and record producer. His father is  Jüri Mazurtšak, the drummer from the Estonian band, Night Star.

On 2 November 2022, it was announced that he will participate in Eesti Laul 2023 with the song "Venom". He participated in the first semi-final, and qualified to the final. In the final, he qualified to the superfinal and eventually came in second place after Alika.

Discography

Singles 
 2015 – Bonfire (featuring Uku Suviste)
 2016 – Like This (featuring Mariliis Jõgeva)
 2022 – Let It Burn
 2022 – Fake
 2022 – Venom

References 

Estonian singers
21st-century Estonian singers
21st-century Estonian male singers
1993 births
Living people